Venkatapati Raya (or Venkata II, r. 1585–1614 CE) was the younger brother of Sriranga Deva Raya (also the youngest son of Tirumala Deva Raya ) and the ruler of Vijayanagara Empire with bases in Penukonda, Chandragiri and Vellore. His reign of three decades saw a revival of the strength and prosperity of the empire. He dealt successfully with the Deccan sultans of Bijapur and Golkonda, the internal disorders, promoting economic revival in the country. He brought rebelling Nayakas of Tamil Nadu and parts of present-day Andhra Pradesh under control.

Wars

Battles of Sultans
In 1588 he instigated a war with the Golkonda and Bijapur Sultanates and captured some of the territories lost earlier by his predecessor. Kasturiranga Nayaka, a scion of Recherla Velama dynasty was sent to check the combined armies of the Sultanates. Hindu army led by Kasturiranga and his son Yachamanedu fought a series of battles with patriotic zeal and achieved the success. Muslim soldiers who escaped in these battles from the Vijayanagar army joined their main troops on the upper bank of river pennar. Historic accounts say that the strength of sultanates army was more than 120,000 and Turko-Afghan gunners were with them to fire their Artillery units. Kasturiranga led the imperial troops towards north and met the enemy directly on the upper bank of river Pennar.

The clash raged for 8 hours, artillery units of the sultanate army created havoc in the Vijaynagar ranks but Yachama kept the discipline among his forces and rigorously pressed the attack. By the end of the day, brave and wise generalship of Vijaynagar won the Battle of Pennar and more than 50,000 Golkonda and Bijapur troops were exterminated including the Sultans most able generals Rustam Khan and Khasim Khan. Imperial forces drove their enemies into the Golkonda territory but the quarrel among king's nobles prevented further attempts on Golkonda. Several of his chieftains in his North now revolted against him, including some of Aliya Rama Raya's descendants, but successfully subdued them.

Nayak rebellions

Nayak of Gingee
In 1586 the Nayak of Gingee, rebelled against Venkatapati, who captured him and had him put in prison and was only freed when Raghunatha Nayak of Tanjore secured his release after helping Venkatapati in his Penukonda campaign.

During his imprisonment, Gingee was ruled by another one Venkata, who was sent against him by Venkatapathi Raya.

Nayak of Vellore
In 1601 another campaign led by his viceroy of Arcot and Chengelpet, Yachamanedu subdued a revolt headed by the Lingama Nayak, the Nayak of Vellore. Later Lingama Nayak of Vellore was defeated, and the Vellore Fort came under direct control of Venkatapati Raya. Another expedition headed by Yachamanedu went right into the Madurai Nayak kingdom, putting those revolting Nayaks in order.

Shifting the capital
Around 1592 Venkatapati shifted his capital from Penukonda to Chandragiri, which was further south near the Tirupathi hills. After 1604, he shifted capital from Chandragiri to Vellore Fort, which was used as a major base.

Revival
The northern territories of his empire was brought into order by offering easy terms on taxes and reviving agricultural, which was frequently run over by the invading Sultans. Village administration was streamlined and judiciary was stringently enforced.

Arrival of Dutch 
In 1608 the Dutch who were already trading in the Golkonda and Gingee regions sought permission to set up a factory in Pulicat. The English too started trading through the Dutch from Pulicat. Since 1586, Gobburi Obayama, the favorite queen of Venkatapati Raya, now operating from the new capital at Chandragiri, was bequeathed Pulicat to rule. She also gave aid to Portuguese Jesuits to build a residence at Pulicat.

Successor
Venkatapati, in spite of having several queens, did not have a son, hence appointed Sriranga II, the son of his older brother Rama as his successor. This was done to prevent one of his favorite queen Bayamma who practiced a fraud on the King by borrowing a baby of her Brahmin maid and calling it as her own. While Robert Swell's book mentions that the infant was surreptitiously introduced into the palace by Bayamma born out from the marriage of a niece of Venkata I (the son of Achyuta Deva Raya) and a Brahman boy, who had been and educated in the pretence that he was son of King Venkata.

Venkatapati Raya, knowing the controversial status of the so-called heir apparent, appointed Sriranga II, the son of his viceregal brother Rama, as his successor.

Venkatapati Raya died in October 1614, and was succeeded by Sriranga II .

References

Bibliography
 
 
 
 

1614 deaths
17th-century Indian monarchs
People of the Vijayanagara Empire
Telugu monarchs
Year of birth unknown